Luís Manuel Mendes Pereira (born 25 June 1981), known as Luís Manuel,  is a Portuguese retired footballer who played as a midfielder.

Club career
Born in Braga, Luís Manuel spent seven years in local S.C. Braga's youth system. He only appeared for the reserve side as a senior, however.

After a one-year spell with GD Joane in the fourth division, and another with Sport Clube Dragões Sandinenses in the third, Luís Manuel signed with Leixões S.C. in 2004, making his professional debut on 29 August of that year in a Segunda Liga match against S.C. Espinho (90 minutes played, 3–2 away win). Subsequently, he moved to the Primeira Liga with C.D. Nacional, but left at the end of the 2005–06 season with only two competitive appearances to his credit.

In the following years, Luís Manuel competed in all three major levels of Portuguese football, with F.C. Vizela, Gil Vicente FC (two spells, two consecutive campaigns in the top flight from 2011 to 2013), U.D. Leiria, A.D. Lousada and C.D. Aves.

References

External links

1981 births
Living people
Sportspeople from Braga
Portuguese footballers
Association football midfielders
Primeira Liga players
Liga Portugal 2 players
Segunda Divisão players
S.C. Braga B players
G.D. Joane players
S.C. Dragões Sandinenses players
Leixões S.C. players
C.D. Nacional players
F.C. Vizela players
Gil Vicente F.C. players
U.D. Leiria players
A.D. Lousada players
C.D. Aves players